Soccer has enjoyed longstanding popularity in Los Angeles. As of 2019 there are two professional soccer clubs in Los Angeles County that play in Major League Soccer: LA Galaxy and Los Angeles FC. The Los Angeles area is also home to two Division 2 professional teams in the USL Championship: Orange County SC and LA Galaxy II, the reserve side of LA Galaxy, and many semi-professional clubs and leagues including the United Premier Soccer League, SoCal Premier League and National Premier Soccer League, among others. In 2019, two more professional teams, Cal FC (Thousand Oaks) and  California United Strikers FC (Orange County) joined a new, unsanctioned, professional league called the NPSL Founders Cup They both later left, with Cal FC joining the United Premier Soccer League and California United Strikers joined the Division 3 semi-professional National Independent Soccer Association, where they joined LA Force. Angel City FC plans to start play in the National Women's Soccer League, the only fully professional women's league in the U.S., in 2022.

History
Soccer in Los Angeles began in the 20th century when the Southern California Football League was founded in 1902.

Historic clubs

Los Angeles Kickers

The LA Kickers were the first LA area team to win the National Challenge Cup, known today as the U.S. Open Cup.

Maccabi Los Angeles

LA Maccabi won the U.S. Open Cup, known in their time as the National Challenge Cup, a record number five times.

Orange County Soccer Club

The Orange County Soccer Club was a two-time consecutive finalist of the National Challenge Cup, in 1966 and '67. OCSC played Bayern Munich at Santa Ana Stadium in 1966.

Los Angeles Aztecs

The LA Aztecs won the NASL National Championship in their inaugural season, 1974. They played in many stadiums, including the Los Angeles Memorial Coliseum. The Aztecs folded in 1981.

California Sunshine

The California Sunshine, an Orange County based pro team, played in the ASL.

Chivas USA

Club Deportivo Chivas USA was a joint venture between Chivas de Guadalajara owner Jorge Vergara, partner Antonio Cué, and Major League Soccer, that operated Chivas trademarks in the United States through the Delaware entity called Chivas de Guadalajara Licensing, LLC. The team folded in 2014.

Historic season records

Los Angeles Wolves (USA and NASL) (1967–1968)

Los Angeles Aztecs (NASL) (1974–81)

Several years after the formation of the North American Soccer League in 1968, the Los Angeles Aztecs joined NASL as an expansion team in 1974, and played from 1974 until 1981, folding after the 1981 season. The team featured international superstars such as George Best and Johan Cruyff.  The team was at its most popular in 1979 and 1980, averaging over 12,000 fans both seasons.

California Surf (NASL) (1978–1981)

Chivas USA (MLS) (2005–2014)

Professional clubs, Modern era

LA Galaxy (MLS) (1996–present)

The launch of Major League Soccer in 1996 included the newly formed Los Angeles Galaxy as one of the founding teams. LA Soccer Partners were the original owners; Anschutz Entertainment Group is the current owner. The Galaxy won the CONCACAF Champions Cup in 2000.

Los Angeles FC (MLS) (2018–present)

Los Angeles derbies

LA Galaxy vs Chivas USA (2008–2014)

The rivalry ended in 2014 when Chivas ceased operations.

LA Galaxy vs Los Angeles FC (2018–present)

Los Angeles FC joined the league in 2018 and a crosstown rivalry, El Tráfico, was created.

Amateur and Semi-professional

Amateur and Semi-professional leagues
 National Premier Soccer League
 United Premier Soccer League
 USL League Two

Amateur and Semi-professional clubs
 California United FC II (UPSL)
 Cal FC (UPSL)
 Club Xolos USA U-23 (NPSL)
 FC Golden State Force (NPSL/USL2)
 FC Santa Clarita (UPSL)
 La Máquina FC (UPSL)
 L.A. Wolves FC (UPSL)
 Orange County FC (NPSL/UPSL)
 Oxnard Guerreros FC (NPSL)
 San Nicolás FC (US Premiership)
 Santa Ana Winds FC (UPSL)
 Temecula FC (NPSL)
 Ventura County Fusion (USL2)

Most successful clubs overall 
Teams in bold are still active.

Stadia 

 Rose Bowl: Hosted the 1994 FIFA World Cup Final
 Dignity Health Sports Park: Second American sports arena designed specifically for soccer in the MLS era. Used historically by the LA Galaxy and Chivas USA.
 Banc of California Stadium: Stadium for Los Angeles FC, opened April 29, 2018. Also to be the home ground for Angel City FC once that team starts play in 2022.
 Santa Ana Stadium: A site for historic soccer exhibition games. The historic Orange County Soccer Club played Bayern Munich at this stadium in 1966. Other games included the following:

Women's soccer
In 2009, Los Angeles became home to a third top-level professional team, the Los Angeles Sol, a charter member of Women's Professional Soccer. WPS was the second attempt to establish a fully professional women's league in the U.S., after the demise of the Women's United Soccer Association (which did not have an L.A. representative). The Sol shared The Home Depot Center, now known as Dignity Health Sports Park, with the Galaxy and Chivas USA, before ceasing operations in January 2010.

WPS folded after the 2011 season; its effective successor, the National Women's Soccer League, does not currently have a fully operational franchise in Los Angeles, nor in California. In July 2020, a then-unnamed team backed by an almost all-female ownership group was announced as a new NWSL member. The team, later unveiled as Angel City FC, plans to start play in 2022 at Banc of California Stadium, home to Los Angeles FC of MLS.

Indoor soccer
Although the area does not have any current professional indoor soccer teams, Los Angeles has hosted three.  The Los Angeles Aztecs played one tournament and two seasons in the NASL Indoor leagues in 1975 and from 1979 to 1981.  The Los Angeles Lazers played in the original Major Indoor Soccer League from 1982 to 1989.  Finally, the Los Angeles United played a single season in the Continental Indoor Soccer League in 1994 before being relocated to Anaheim.

See also 
 Soccer in the United States
 Soccer in Houston
 Soccer in New York City
 History of professional soccer in Seattle

References

 
Soccer in California
Soccer
Los Angeles